Admiral Sir Clement Moody,  (31 May 1891 – 6 July 1960) was a Royal Navy officer who served as Commander-in-Chief, East Indies Fleet, from 1945 to 1946 and Commander-in-Chief, South Atlantic, from 1946 to 1948.

Naval career
Moody was appointed a sub-lieutenant in the Royal Navy in 1911. He commanded the aircraft carrier  from 1937.

Moody served in the Second World War as Director of the Naval Air Division and then as second-in-command of Naval Air Stations in 1941. He was made second-in-command of Aircraft Carriers in Home Waters in 1943; in April 1944 he took part in Operation Cockpit, a bombing raid on Japanese port and oil facilities on Sabang Island (off the northern tip of Sumatra).

Moody went on to be Commander-in-Chief, East Indies Fleet, from 15 December 1945 to 8 March 1946. His last appointment was as Commander-in-Chief, South Atlantic, in 1946; he retired in 1948.

References

|-

1891 births
1960 deaths
Knights Commander of the Order of the Bath
Royal Navy admirals of World War II
Royal Navy personnel of World War I
Military personnel from Surrey